Jim L. Barker (June 20, 1935 – April 25, 2005) was a Democratic politician from the U.S. state of Oklahoma. He is the only state representative to serve four times as Speaker of the Oklahoma House of Representatives.

Barker authored several bills that became national models and addressed as fiscal crisis in the state during his time as speaker. He was ousted from office during his fourth term, due to political infighting. He died April 25, 2005, of a stroke in Oklahoma City.

Early life
Born in Muskogee, Oklahoma, on June 20, 1935, Barker graduated from the Oklahoma Military Academy and earned a degree in business administration from Northeastern Oklahoma State University in 1957. He was the son of Fred and Pearl Barker. He served as a first lieutenant in the U.S. Army's First Infantry Division and returned to Oklahoma to found Muskogee Restaurant Supply. He married Kay Tucker.

Political career
Barker was first elected to the Oklahoma House of Representatives in 1969, but served only one term, before returning to serve from 1977 through 1990. He was first elected speaker in 1983, following the conviction of the former speaker on fraud charges. As speaker, he inherited a fiscal crisis brought on by the collapse of the oil boom and a severe depression in the agricultural sector. Barker addressed the crisis by diversifying Oklahoma's revenue base and a series of tax increases.

Barker authored many bills that became national role models, among them five pieces of legislation titled the Victim Bill of Rights. As speaker he was an early author of the state's Rainy Day Fund legislation, which established a set-aside for state emergencies.

Barker was ousted from his post as speaker on May 17, 1989, due to political infighting.

Later life and death
Barker moved to Edmond, Oklahoma, and worked as a lobbyist after his term as a state representative ended. He died on April 25, 2005, leaving his wife, Kay, a widow. The cause of death was a stroke that occurred while he was at Mercy Health Center in Oklahoma City.

See also
40th Oklahoma Legislature
41st Oklahoma Legislature
42nd Oklahoma Legislature
43rd Oklahoma Legislature

References

External links
Jim Barker Collection and Photograph Collection at the Carl Albert Center
Historic Members of the Oklahoma House of Representatives

1935 births
2005 deaths
Politicians from Muskogee, Oklahoma
Northeastern State University alumni
20th-century American politicians
Speakers of the Oklahoma House of Representatives
Democratic Party members of the Oklahoma House of Representatives
United States Army officers